In the 1990 FIFA World Cup the main disciplinary action taken against players came in the form of red and yellow cards. Any player picking up a red card is automatically banned for his country's next game (if it is a serious offense FIFA may extend this ban to a number of games). Players also receive a one-game ban if they pick up two yellow cards within the group stage or within the knockout stage.

Disciplinary statistics
Total number of yellow cards: 193
Average number of yellow cards: 3.71
Total number of red cards: 16
Average number of red cards: 0.31
First yellow card: Benjamin Massing – Cameroon against Argentina
First red card: André Kana-Biyik – Cameroon vs Argentina
Fastest yellow card from kick off: 4 minutes – Marius Lăcătuş – Romania vs Argentina
Fastest yellow card after coming on as a substitute: 1 minute – Peter Beardsley – England vs. Egypt
Latest yellow card in a match without extra time: 90 minutes + – Ernst Aigner – Austria vs. Czechoslovakia
Fastest dismissal from kick off: 34 minutes – Peter Artner – Austria vs United States
Fastest dismissal of a substitute: 6 minutes – Andreas Reisinger – Austria vs United States
Latest dismissal in a match without extra time: 89 minutes – Benjamin Massing – Cameroon against Argentina
Least time difference between two yellow cards given to the same player: 0 minutes – Yoon Deuk-Yeo – Korea Republic against Uruguay (Yoon was given two yellow cards in the 70th minute)
Most yellow cards (team): 21 – Argentina
Most red cards (team): 3 – Argentina
Fewest yellow cards (team): 2 – Belgium
Most yellow cards (player): 3 – (three players) Benjamin Massing, Yoon Deuk-Yeo, Frank Rijkaard
Most red cards (player): 1 – (16 players) Ricardo Giusti, Eric Wynalda, Peter Artner, Frank Rijkaard, Rudi Völler, Yoon Deuk-Yeo, Ľubomír Moravčík, Ricardo Gomes, Benjamin Massing, André Kana-Biyik, Volodymyr Bezsonov, Khalil Ghanim, Refik Šabanadžović, Eric Gerets, Gustavo Dezotti, Pedro Monzón
Most yellow cards (match): 9 – Austria vs United States (Group A)
Most red cards (match): 2 – West Germany vs Netherlands (round of 16)
Most cards in one match: 9 yellow cards and 1 red card – Austria vs United States (Group A)

Sanctions

By referee

By team

By individual

1 red card
 Gustavo Dezotti
 Ricardo Giusti
 Pedro Monzón
 Peter Artner
 Eric Gerets
 Ricardo Gomes
 André Kana-Biyik
 Benjamin Massing
 Ľubomír Moravčík
 Yoon Deuk-Yeo
 Frank Rijkaard
 Khalil Ghanim
 Volodymyr Bezsonov
 Eric Wynalda
 Rudi Völler
 Refik Šabanadžović
3 yellow cards
 Ricardo Giusti
 Benjamin Massing
 Ľubomír Moravčík
 Andreas Brehme
 Rudi Völler
 Yoon Deuk-Yeo
 Frank Rijkaard
 Refik Šabanadžović
2 yellow cards
 Sergio Batista
 Gustavo Dezotti
 Ricardo Giusti
 Pedro Monzón
 Julio Olarticoechea
 José Serrizuela
 Pedro Troglio
 Robert Pecl
 Manfred Zsak
 Eric Gerets
 Mozer
 André Kana-Biyik
 Roger Milla
 Victor Ndip
 Thomas Nkono
 Gabriel Gómez
 Róger Gómez
 Hector Marchena
 Luboš Kubík
 František Straka
 Paul Gascoigne
 Rudi Völler
 Chris Morris
 Nicola Berti
 Gheorghe Hagi
 Marius Lăcătuş
 Khalil Ghanim
 Yousuf Hussain
 Jimmy Banks
 José Perdomo
1 yellow card
 Jorge Burruchaga
 Claudio Caniggia
 Sergio Goycochea
 Diego Maradona
 Julio Olarticoechea
 Oscar Ruggeri
 Roberto Sensini
 Juan Simón
 Ernst Aigner
 Gerald Glatzmeyer
 Andreas Herzog
 Klaus Lindenberger
 Anton Pfeffer
 Andreas Reisinger
 Branco
 Dunga
 Mauro Galvão
 Jorginho
 Ricardo Rocha
 Emile Mbouh
 Jules Onana
 Leonel Álvarez
 Luis Fernando Herrera
 Luis Carlos Perea
 Rónald González Brenes
 Claudio Jara
 Michal Bílek
 Jozef Chovanec
 Ivan Hašek
 Miroslav Kadlec
 Ivo Knoflíček
 Ján Kocian
 Tomáš Skuhravý
 Magdi Abdelghani
 Ibrahim Hassan
 Ahmed Ramzy
 Ahmed Shobair
 Peter Beardsley
 Steve McMahon
 Paul Parker
 Stuart Pearce
 Thomas Berthold
 Jürgen Klinsmann
 Lothar Matthäus
 Roberto Baggio
 Luigi De Agostini
 Riccardo Ferri
 Giuseppe Giannini
 Choi Kang-Hee
 Choi Soon-Ho
 Chung Hae-Won
 Hwangbo Kwan
 Lee Heung-Sil
 Wim Kieft
 Marco van Basten
 Jan Wouters
 John Aldridge
 Paul McGrath
 Kevin Moran
 Michael Klein
 Ioan Lupescu
 Dănuţ Lupu
 Mo Johnston
 Murdo MacLeod
 David McPherson
 Vagiz Khidiyatullin
 Oleh Protasov
 Andrei Zygmantovich
 Chendo
 Manuel Jiménez Jiménez
 Roberto
 Francisco Villarroya
 Joakim Nilsson
 Stefan Schwarz
 Glenn Strömberg
 Jonas Thern
 Hussain Ghuloum
 Eissa Meer
 Ibrahim Meer
 Fernando Álvez
 Enzo Francescoli
 Nelson Gutiérrez
 José Oscar Herrera
 José Pintos Saldanha
 Paul Caligiuri
 Tony Meola
 Bruce Murray
 Steve Trittschuh
 Mike Windischmann
 Dragoljub Brnović
 Srečko Katanec
 Darko Pančev
 Dragan Stojković
 Zlatko Vujović
 Zoran Vulić

Discipline, 1990 Fifa World Cup